Reality Check was a 1995 television show starring Ryan Seacrest as Jack Craft, a 19-year-old inventor who gets stuck in his computer mainframe project on June 8, 1995. The two Bonner siblings (Samantha and Nicholas) reactivate the computer on September 17, 1995, attempting to get Jack Craft out of the mainframe, while also encountering additional members of the project.

The show was broadcast under syndication with each episode running for 15 minutes including commercials. It was produced in association with S & S Productions and ran for fourteen episodes before ending.

Characters
 Abigail Gustafson - Samantha Bonner
 John Aaron Bennett - Nicholas Bonner
 Ryan Seacrest - Jack Craft
 Tom Greer - Will
 Maria Cabini - Isis
 Blake Heron - Bud McNeight
 Yasmine Seyfi - Yasmine Shanna
 Marsha Crenshaw - DEV the computer, and additional voices
 Mike Dyche - Glitch and voices

Episodes
 "Note Of A Different Color" - Samantha composes an Earth Day song with the help of animated computer program Mr. Re.
 "The Great Escape"
 "The Ole Ballgame" - Nicholas learns about swinging strategies with the help of Jack and guest star Terry Pendleton.
 ? - This episode travelled through time for what had happened in the 1960s, 1970s (featuring Jack Craft), 1980s (featuring Isis), and 1990s.

External links

1995 American television series debuts
1990s American children's television series
Mainframe computers